The Treaty of Amity and Cooperation in Southeast Asia (TAC) is a peace treaty among Southeast Asian countries established by the founding members of the Association of Southeast Asian Nations (ASEAN), a geo-political and economic organisation of 10 countries located in Southeast Asia.

History
On 24 February 1976, the treaty was signed into force by the leaders of the original members of ASEAN, Lee Kuan Yew, Ferdinand Marcos, Datuk Hussein Onn, Kukrit Pramoj, and Suharto. Other members acceded to it upon or before joining the bloc. It was amended on 15 December 1987 by a protocol to open the document for accession by states outside Southeast Asia, and again on 25 July 1998, to condition such accession on the consent of all member states. On 23 July 2001, the parties established the rules of procedure of the treaty's High Council, which was stipulated in Article 14 of the document. On 7 October 2003, during the annual summit, a declaration was released that says:
 "A High Council of [the treaty] shall be the important component in the ASEAN Security Community since it reflects ASEAN's commitment to resolve all differences, disputes and conflicts peacefully."
Papua New Guinea was the first country outside ASEAN to sign the treaty in 1989. , sixteen countries outside the bloc have acceded to the treaty. On 22 July 2009, Secretary of State Hillary Clinton signed the TAC on behalf of the United States. The European Union announced in 2009 its intention to accede as soon as the treaty would be amended to allow for the accession of non-states and joined accordingly on 12 July 2012.

The treaty has been endorsed by the General Assembly stating that:
"The purposes and principles of the Treaty of Amity and Cooperation in Southeast Asia and its provisions for the pacific settlement of regional disputes and for regional co-operation to achieve peace, amity and friendship among the peoples of Southeast Asia [are] in accordance with the Charter of the United Nations."

Principles
The purpose of the Treaty is to promote perpetual peace, everlasting amity and co-operation among the people of Southeast Asia which would contribute to their strength, solidarity, and closer relationship. In their relations with one another, the High Contracting Parties shall be guided by the following fundamental principles;

a. mutual respect for the independence, sovereignty, equality, territorial integrity and national identity of all nations,

b. the right of every State to lead its national existence free from external interference, subversion or coercion,

c. non-interference in the internal affairs of one another,

d. settlement of differences or disputes by peaceful means,

e. renunciation of the threat or use of force, and

f. effective co-operation among themselves.

Parties
The following table lists the parties in the order of the dates on which they entered into the treaty:

References

External links
 "Treaty of Amity and Cooperation in Southeast Asia - Indonesia, 24 February 1976". Association of Southeast Asian Nations. Retrieved 30 November 2018.

ASEAN treaties
History of Southeast Asia
Amity and Cooperation in Southeast Asia
Treaties concluded in 1976
Treaties entered into force in 1976
Treaties of Indonesia
Treaties of the Philippines
Treaties of Malaysia
Treaties of Singapore
Treaties of Thailand
Treaties of Brunei
Treaties of Papua New Guinea
Treaties of Laos
Treaties of Vietnam
Treaties of Cambodia
Treaties of Myanmar
Treaties of the People's Republic of China
Treaties of Japan
Treaties of India
Treaties of Pakistan
Treaties of South Korea
Treaties of Russia
Treaties of New Zealand
Treaties of Mongolia
Treaties of Australia
Treaties of France
Treaties of East Timor
Treaties of Bangladesh
Treaties of Sri Lanka
Treaties of North Korea
Treaties entered into by the European Union
Treaties of the United States
1976 in Indonesia
Treaties of Canada